Developed in 1967, Centennial Park is a large park area that follows the shores of the rocky Current River in the north end of Thunder Bay, Ontario. The park was built to represent the history of logging in Port Arthur (Now part of Thunder Bay). The park features many replicas of the equipment and living conditions on logging camps in the early 20th century. The park also features recreational facilities, such as recreation trails, an animal farm, and a toboggan hill.

Activities
 1910 Logging Camp Re-creation
 Animal Farm
 Recreation trails
 Craft Shop and lodge
 Children's Playground
 "Ride the Muskeg Express Train"
 Picnic area

Hours of operation
 Logging Camp Mid June until September Long Weekend 8:00am–10:00pm
 Park and Farm open all year
 Train Ride Wednesday to Sunday 12:00pm–4:00pm (unavailable in the winter)

Admission
 Entering and exploring the park is free
 Muskeg Express Train:
 Ages 5 and under: Free
 Ages 6 to 12: $1.00
 Ages 12 and up: $2.50

External links
Centennial Park - official site
BorealForest.org Park Profile
Entry on Thunder Bay Unseen

Parks in Thunder Bay
Museums in Thunder Bay
Forestry museums in Canada